Nandmahar Dham or Baba Nandmahar Dham is a Hindu temple located at Musafirkhana, Gauriganj in Amethi District. Nandmahar Dham temple is related to Krishna, Balram, Nand Baba and Vasudeva.

People from various states like Rajasthan, Madhya Pradesh, Maharashtra, Punjab, Haryana, Chhattisgarh and Delhi attend the fair on Kartik Purnima.

Notable visitors to the Nandmahar Dham temple include former Prime Minister Rajiv Gandhi along with Mulayam Singh, Balaram Yadav, Lalu Prasad Yadav, Akhilesh Yadav, Sonia Gandhi and Rahul Gandhi.

Transportation
The nearest airport is Chaudhary Charan Singh International Airport and Gauriganj railway station is the nearest railway station. The closest UPSRTC bus stand is Gauriganj. Private taxis and auto rickshawasare available.

See also
 Chandikan Devi Temple
 Belha Devi Temple
 Ghuisarnath Temple
 Lodi Baba Mandir
 Durgan Dham Temple
 Mata Mawai Dham

References

External links

Krishna temples
Hindu temples in Uttar Pradesh
Amethi district